Keith Dudgeon (born 7 November 1995) is a South African cricketer. He was included in the Gauteng cricket team for the 2015 Africa T20 Cup. He was the joint-leading wicket-taker in the 2017–18 Sunfoil 3-Day Cup for KwaZulu-Natal, with 35 dismissals in ten matches.

In September 2018, he was named in KwaZulu-Natal's squad for the 2018 Africa T20 Cup. He was the leading wicket-taker for KwaZulu-Natal in the 2018–19 CSA 3-Day Provincial Cup, with 38 dismissals in eight matches. In April 2021, he was named in KwaZulu-Natal Inland's squad, ahead of the 2021–22 cricket season in South Africa. In November 2021, Dudgeon was signed by C.I.Y.M.S. Cricket Club to play in Ireland during the 2022 season.

References

External links
 

1995 births
Living people
South African cricketers
Gauteng cricketers
KwaZulu-Natal cricketers
Cricketers from Johannesburg